The Mount Adams Wilderness is a  wilderness area in the U.S. state of Washington managed by the U.S. Forest Service. The wilderness encompasses an ecologically complex and geologically active landscape. Weather differs between the dry eastside and moist westside of the mountain. At , Mount Adams is one of the major Cascade mountains. The wilderness area is on the west side of the mountain and is part of the Gifford Pinchot National Forest. The east side of the mountain is part of the Yakama Nation, with the southeast side part of the Mount Adams Recreation Area, and includes Bird Creek Meadows.

Recreation
Recreation includes hiking, backpacking, mountain climbing, and equestrian sports. A Volcano Pass from the U.S. Forest Service is required for activities above . Some areas of the mountain in the Yakama Nation are open for recreation, while other areas are open only to members of the tribe.

Climbing 
Each year, hundreds of people attempt to summit Mount Adams. Crampons and ice axes are needed on many routes because of the glaciers and how steep they are. But it is possible to climb with just boots and ski poles on the south side of the mountain in the summer, via the South Climb Spur, partway on the South Climb Trail #183. The biggest hazard is the loose rocks and boulders which are easily dislodged and a severe hazard for climbers below. Climbing Mount Adams can be dangerous for a variety of reasons and people do die in pursuit of the summit.

Hiking 
The Mount Adams Wilderness has a number of hiking trails. Trails in the wilderness pass through dry east-side and moist west-side forests, with views of Mt. Adams and its glaciers, streams, open alpine forests, parklands, and wildflowers which speckle the lava flows and rimrocks.

Many trails access the Round the Mountain trail. On the south, the Shorthorn Trail leaves from near the Morrison Creek Campground and the South Climb Trail starts as Cold Springs Campground and heads up the South Spur, a common climbing route to the summit. On the west side, there are three trails going up: the Stagman Ridge Trail, Pacific Crest Trail, and the Riley Creek Trail. On the north side are the Divide Camp, Killen Creek, Muddy Meadows trails, and the Pacific Crest Trail as it heads down the mountain. Trails are mostly snow-covered from early winter until early summer. The Round the Mountain Trail, the Pacific Crest Trail, and the Highline Trail almost completely encircle the mountain, save for a 4-mile section known as "The Gap" on the east side of the Mountain, in the Mount Adams Recreation Area. Other trails in the Mount Adams Wilderness include the Lookingglass Lake Trail, High Camp Trail #10, Salt Creek Trail #75, Crofton Butte Trail #73, and the Riley Connector Trail #64A.

References

External links

Mount Adams Wilderness U.S. Forest Service
Mount Adams Wilderness Wilderness.net (The University of Montana)

Cascade Range
Protected areas of Skamania County, Washington
Wilderness areas of Washington (state)
Protected areas of Yakima County, Washington
Gifford Pinchot National Forest
Mount Adams (Washington)
Midway High Lakes Area
Protected areas established in 1964
1964 establishments in Washington (state)
Yakama